Argo is an unincorporated community in Walker County, Alabama, United States.

Demographics
According to the returns from 1850-2010 for Alabama, it has never reported a population figure separately on the U.S. Census.

References

Unincorporated communities in Walker County, Alabama
Unincorporated communities in Alabama